The Charles E. Johnson Building is a building located in northeast Portland, Oregon, United States, listed on the National Register of Historic Places.

See also
 National Register of Historic Places listings in Northeast Portland, Oregon

References

1912 establishments in Oregon
Commercial buildings completed in 1912
Buildings designated early commercial in the National Register of Historic Places
National Register of Historic Places in Portland, Oregon
Northeast Portland, Oregon
Portland Historic Landmarks